The Charlotte Convention Center is a convention center located in Charlotte, North Carolina. It opened in 1995 and attracts more than half a million visitors each year. It was designed by Thompson, Ventulett, Stainback & Associates (TVS).

It has  of contiguous exhibit space. The ballroom spans  with banquet seating for up to 1,800 guests.

The LYNX and the now defunct Charlotte Trolley lines pass straight through the center of the convention center. The convention center was recently expanded to include an additional ballroom since the NASCAR Hall of Fame is connected to the convention center.

Expansion
In April 2017, the Charlotte Regional Visitors Authority announced a $110-million expansion to the convention center. The expansion will increase the meeting space by 50,000 square feet and add a bridge for pedestrians linking the center to the Westin Hotel nearby. The project was expected to start construction in early 2019.

References

External links
 

Buildings and structures in Charlotte, North Carolina
Convention centers in North Carolina
Economy of Charlotte, North Carolina
Tourist attractions in Charlotte, North Carolina